This is a list of mines in New Brunswick, Canada.

 Austin Brook Iron Mine
 Caribou zinc mine
 Chester Mine
 CNE Mine
 Key Anacon Mine
 Murray Brook Mine
 North Zone mine
 Stratmat Boundary Mine
 Wedge Mine

New Brunswick
Mines in New Brunswick